Elbow Pass is the mountain pass between the Highwood and Elbow areas in Kananaskis Country, Alberta, Canada.  It contains Elbow Lake which is the headwaters of the Elbow River.

The pass is formed between Mount Rae of the Misty Range and Gap Mountain of the South Banff Ranges.

Good hiking and mountain biking routes connect the Little Elbow recreation area at the end of Highway 66 to the Highwood Pass area on Bighorn Highway.

External links
Peakfinder. Elbow Pass

Kananaskis Improvement District
Mountain passes of Alberta